Slovenia sent a delegation to compete at the 2010 Winter Paralympics, in Vancouver, British Columbia, Canada. It fielded a single athlete, in alpine skiing. It did not win a medal.

Alpine skiing 

The following athlete was Slovenia's sole representative in alpine skiing:

See also
Slovenia at the 2010 Winter Olympics
Slovenia at the Paralympics

References

External links
Vancouver 2010 Paralympic Games official website
International Paralympic Committee official website

Nations at the 2010 Winter Paralympics
2010
Paralympics